The Zamani Project is part of the African Cultural Heritage Sites and Landscapes Database. Zamani is a research group at the University of Cape Town, which acquires, models, presents and manages spatial and other data from cultural heritage sites. The present focus of the Zamani project is Africa, with the principal objective of developing “The African Cultural Heritage Sites and Landscapes Database”.  Zamani comes from the Swahili phrase “Hapo zamani za kale” which means “Once upon a time”, and can be used to mean 'the past'. The word is derived from Arabic root for temporal vocabulary, ‘Zaman,’ and appears in several languages around the world.

History 
The Zamani initiative was conceptualised in the Geomatics Division of the University of Cape Town by Professor Heinz Rüther in 2001 in collaboration with ITHAKA and Aluka [now an initiative of JSTOR] as the “African Cultural Heritage Sites and Landscapes Database” in 2004 with a number of sequential grants from the Andrew W. Mellon Foundation. The project developed out of a long history of heritage documentation in the Geomatics division reaching from conventional mapping of archaeological sites in the early stages of the project to advanced digital modeling of complex sites in its present phase.

Motivation 
The documentation project aims to capture spatial information to create a permanent record of important heritage sites for restoration and conservation purposes and as a record for future generations. The project seeks to provide material for education, research and site management and increase international awareness of African heritage on a not-for-profit basis.

Data 
Spatial data of architectural structures and historical landscapes are acquired by means of laser scanning, conventional surveys, GPS surveys and photogrammetric imaging with calibrated cameras. Satellite images, aerial photography and full-dome panorama photography are also employed as are contextual photography and videos. The data are captured by the project team during field campaigns. The acquired data are processed to produce Geographic Information Systems (GIS), 3D computer models, maps, architectural sections and building plans and interactive panorama tours of the heritage sites. Sites are seen in the context of their physical environment and therefore landscapes surrounding sites are modelled in 3D using satellite and aerial imagery wherever possible.

Sites
The following is a list of sites which have been documented:
Algeria
 Djémila
 M'Zien (Lemzyen)

Cameroon
 Mandara Hills: DGB I & II

Ethiopia
 Lalibela: 13 rock-hewn churches
 Axum: Stele-field
 Gondar: Fasil Ghebbi

Ghana
 Elmina: Elmina Castle
 Besease/Kumasi: Ashanti Shrine

Jordan
 Petra: Siq
 Petra: Treasury (Al-Khazneh)
 Petra: Monastery (Ad Deir)
 Petra: Urn Tomb
 Petra: Tomb of the Roman Soldier
 Petra: Palace Tomb
 Petra: Corinthian Tomb
 Petra: Silk Tomb
 Petra: Theater
 Petra: Qasr al-Bint
 Petra: Great Temple
 Petra: Facade Tombs
 Petra: Temple of the Winged Lions
 Petra: Turkmeniyeh Tomb
 Petra: Soldier Tomb (Wadi Farasa)
 Petra: Garden Tomb (Wadi Farasa)
 Petra: Renaissance Tomb (Wadi Farasa)
 Petra: Triclinium (Wadi Farasa)
 Petra: Djinn Blocks (before Siq entrance)
 Petra: Obelisk Tomb (before Siq entrance)
 Petra:  landscape of Wadi Musa and the landscape of Wadi Farasa

Kenya
 Lamu: Fortress, Swahili Building and historical street scene
 Shela: Shiathna-Asheri Mosque
 Gede: Palace, Mosque and buildings
 Namoratung'a: Stelae field
 Turkana Village: village huts
 Tot Village: village huts

Mali
 Djenne: Great Mosque
 Timbuktu: Friday Mosque

Mozambique
 Mozambique Island: Fortress and Chapel

Myanmar
 Bagan (Several Temple & Pagodas)

Sri Lanka
 Medirigiriya Watadageya
 Polonnaruwa

South Africa
 Mapungubwe: Iron Age site of Mapungubwe Hill, plus rock art site
 Pretoria: Union Buildings
 Cape Town: Good Hope Castle
 Wonderwerk Cave: cave with early human occupation
 Cederberg: 6 rock art sites
 Saldhana: Stone age site
 Langebaan: Paleontological site
 Drakensberg: 2 rock art sites
 
Sudan
 Musawwarat es-Sufra: Great Enclosure temple complex and Temple of Apedemak
 
Tanzania
 Kilwa Kisiwani: Fortress, Mosque, Palace
 Songo Mnara: Palace, Mosque, Buildings, Graveyard
 Engaruka: Drystone structures
 Stone Town in Zanzibar: 2 Persian baths and Beit Al-Amani
 
Uganda
 Nyero: 5 rock art sites
 Mukongolo: 3 rock art sites
 Kampiri: rock art site
 Lolui Island: rock art site
 Kokoro: 3 rock art sites
 
Zimbabwe
 Great Zimbabwe: Great Enclosure and Hill complex

Undocumented sites
These sites have been documented by the project team but not included in the database 
1. Algeria, Tassili: Engravings (TARA)
2. Egypt, Luxor: Valley of the Queens (Getty Conservation Institute, L.A.)
3. Jordan, Petra: SIQ canyon and tombs in co-operation with UNESCO
4. Tanzania, Laetoli: Hominid Trackway (Getty Conservation Institute, L.A.)
5. United Arab Emirates, Al Ain: Archaeological site (ADACH, Abu Dhabi)

Access to data 
The database is conceptualised as a holistic system and therefore spatial data acquired by the Zamani group are augmented by contextual non-spatial data contributed to JSTOR by various additional partners and organizations.  This entire set of materials is made available to the scholarly community via JSTOR's Aluka initiative.  Access to this collection is free to all institutions and organizations in Africa and portions of the developing world.  Libraries and academic institutions outside of Africa can license access to these collections via JSTOR. The Zamani Project website provides a showcase for the data it produces. Subsets of the 3D data, such as panorama tours and flythrough animations can be viewed on the site as well as examples of plans, sections and photographs.

Funding 
The African Cultural Heritage Sites and Landscapes Database exclusively funded by the Andrew W. Mellon Foundation, New York. Administrative support, office space and other academic services are provided by the University of Cape Town and the Geomatics Division at UCT. Additional funds are generated through documentation work for the Getty Conservation Institute, Los Angeles and the World Monuments Fund, New York. In the early stages of the project UNESCO provided financial support for documentation in Lalibela.

Zamani team 
The Zamani team members comprises four Chief Scientific Officers (Ralph Schroeder, Roshan Bhurtha, Stephen Wessels and Bruce McDonald) under the leadership of the Principal Investigator, Prof. Heinz Rüther. Interns from UCT and international university's also occasionally join the team. Occasionally Christoph Held (former team member,  currently works with laser scanning manufacturer Zoller and Fröhlich (Z+F)) and Professor Werner Stempfhuber (from the Beuth University in Berlin) accompany the Zamani team on field campaigns.

References 

 Building a Digital Library of Scholarly Resources from the Developing World. An introduction to Aluka. Rahim Rajan, Heinz Rüther. African Arts, Volume 40, Number 2, page 1
 Documenting African Sites: The Aluka Project, Heinz Rüther, Rahim S. Rajan. JSAH Volume 66, Number 4, December 2007. Journal of the Society of Architectural Historians.
 Laser scanning for conservation and research of African cultural heritage sites: the case study of Wonderwerk Cave, South Africa, Heinz Rüther, Michael Chazan, Ralph Schroeder, Rudy Neeser, Christoph Held, Steven James Walker, Ari Matmon, Liora Kolska Horwitz.
 Journal of Archaeological Science 36 (2009) 1847–1856

External links 
 http://www.aluka.org/
 http://www.zamaniproject.org/
 https://www.youtube.com/watch?v=8jTlKjUAzn8
 https://www.jstor.org
 http://www.wmf.org/video/3d-laser-scanning-churches-lalibela-ethiopia

Research projects
Heritage organizations
Heritage registers
History organisations based in South Africa